Yegor Aleksandrovich Karpitsky (born 27 November 2003) is a Belarusian professional footballer who plays for Shakhtyor Soligorsk.

Honors
Shakhtyor Soligorsk
Belarusian Premier League: 2021, 2022
Belarusian Super Cup: 2023

References

External links 
 
 

2003 births
Living people
Sportspeople from Vitebsk
Belarusian footballers
Association football forwards
FC Shakhtyor Soligorsk players
FC Shakhtyor Petrikov players